Seaton railway station may refer to:

In England:
 Seaton railway station (Cornwall), on the proposed St Germans & Looe Railway, which was unbuilt
 Seaton railway station (Cumbria), on the Cleator and Workington Junction Railway
 Seaton railway station (Devon)
 Seaton railway station (County Durham), on the North Eastern Railway
 Seaton Delaval railway station, also on the North Eastern Railway
 Seaton railway station (Rutland)

In Australia:
 Seaton Park railway station in Adelaide, South Australia